Heiligenstadt may refer to:

 Heilbad Heiligenstadt, Thuringia, Germany
 Heiligenstadt in Oberfranken, Bavaria, Germany
 Heiligenstadt, Vienna, Austria
 Heiligenstadt, part of Neuhaus, Carinthia, Austria

See also
 Heiligenstadt station (disambiguation)
 Heiligenstadt Testament, an 1802 letter written by Ludwig van Beethoven written at Heiligenstadt, Vienna